Mattel v. MCA Records, 296 F.3d 894 (9th Cir. 2002), was a series of lawsuits between Mattel and MCA Records that resulted from the 1997 hit single "Barbie Girl" by Danish group Aqua. The case was ultimately dismissed.

Background
On September 11, 1997, Mattel filed suit in the United States District Court for the Central District of California, bringing 11 claims against MCA (Aqua's American record label) and others.
Mattel claimed the song violated the Barbie trademark and turned Barbie into a sex object, referring to her as a "Blonde Bimbo." They alleged the song had violated their copyrights and trademarks of Barbie, and that its lyrics had tarnished the reputation of their trademark and impinged on their marketing plan. Mattel also claimed that the cover packaging of the single used "Barbie pink", a registered trademark owned by Mattel. MCA contested Mattel's claims and filed a counterclaim for defamation after Mattel had likened MCA to a bank robber.

MCA moved to dismiss Mattel's complaint for failure to state a claim, which the Central District of California granted. Mattel then appealed to the Ninth Circuit. On appeal, the Ninth Circuit ruled the song was protected as a parody under the trademark doctrine of nominative use and the First Amendment to the United States Constitution, in an opinion penned by Judge Alex Kozinski; the Ninth Circuit also dismissed MCA's defamation counterclaim. Kozinski concluded his ruling by saying, "The parties are advised to chill." Mattel sought certiorari to the Supreme Court of the United States, but its petition was denied.

Response
The controversy was used as an example by journalist Naomi Klein in her book No Logo, where she stated that the monopolies created by copyrights and trademarks are unfairly and differently enforced, based on the legal budgets of the conflicting parties.

In 2009, as part of a marketing strategy to revive sales, Mattel released a promotional video featuring a version of Barbie Girl with modified lyrics.

See also
 Tom Forsythe, a Utah artist unsuccessfully sued by Mattel over his controversial works featuring Barbie dolls

References

External links
 Mattel, Inc. v. MCA Records, Inc., 28 F.Supp.2d 1120 (C.D. Cal. 1998)
 Mattel, Inc. v. MCA Records, Inc., 296 F.3d 894 (9th Cir. 2002)
 Mattel, Inc. v. MCA Records, Inc., no. 02-633 (U.S. Supreme Court docket)

2002 in United States case law
Barbie
Mattel
MCA Records
United States Court of Appeals for the Ninth Circuit cases
United States trademark case law
Toy controversies
Music controversies
Obscenity controversies in music